Narthecusa perplexata is a moth of the family Geometridae first described by Francis Walker in 1862. This species is found from Guinea to Uganda.

Subspecies
Narthecusa perplexata perplexata (Walker, 1862)
Narthecusa perplexata ugandensis L. B. Prout, 1926 (Uganda)

References

External links
"Narthecusa perplexata (Walker, 1862)". African Moths.

Ennominae
Insects of Uganda
Moths of Africa